USS Merrill may refer to the following ships of the United States Navy:

 , a destroyer escort that served during World War II as a ship of the U.S. Coast Guard
 , a Spruance-class destroyer that served from 1978 to 1998

United States Navy ship names